State Route 130 (SR-130) is a state highway in the U.S. state of Utah. Spanning , it connects the town of Minersville in Beaver County with the cities of Cedar City, Enoch, and Parowan to the south in Iron County.

Route description
SR-130 begins at the south Cedar City interchange with Interstate 15 (I-15). Following Main Street through the city, it starts to the northeast before turning north through the center of the city. As the highway reaches the north end of the city, it meets I-15 in another interchange, continuing north through Enoch as the Minersville Highway. Gap Road connects to Parowan, and is named for the pass it traverses, Parowan Gap, site of ancient petroglyphs, evidence that it was on a major thoroughfare of early Native Americans. SR-130 continues in a generally north-northwest direction through the Black Mountains, entering Beaver County and arriving in Minersville, ending at its intersection with SR-21.

The southernmost sections of SR-130, from the southern terminus at I-15 to 4800 North in Enoch, are part of the National Highway System.

History
State Route 130 was originally established in 1933 as the Minersville Loop on SR-21. In 1953, one of the legs of the loop was deleted, turning the highway into a short  spur connecting SR-21 to the center of Minersville. With the construction of Interstate 15 in the area, the route was extended southward again in 1967.

Major intersections

References

External links

 

130
 130
 130